Flotilla admiral is the lowest flag rank, a rank above captain, in the modern navies of Belgium, Bulgaria, Denmark, Finland, Germany and Sweden. It corresponds to the ranks of commodore or rear admiral (lower half) in the navies of the United States, United Kingdom, and certain other countries.

Germany
Flottillenadmiral, short FltlAdm in lists FADM, (en: Flotilla admiral) is the lowest flag officer rank in the German Navy, corresponding to command of a US Navy Rear Admiral (lower half) or Commodore (Royal Navy). It is equivalent to Brigadegeneral in the Bundeswehr or to Admiralarzt/Generalarzt,  Admiralapotheker/Generalapotheker in the Zentraler Sanitätsdienst der Bundeswehr.

Its rank insignia, worn on the sleeves and shoulders, are one five-pointed star above a big gold stripe and a narrow one (without the star when rank loops are worn). It is grade B6 in the pay rules of the Federal Ministry of Defence.

The sequence of ranks (top-down approach) in that particular group is as follows:
OF-9: Admiral (Germany) / General (Germany)
OF-8: Vizeadmiral / Generalleutnant
OF-7: Konteradmiral / Generalmajor
OF-6: Flottillenadmiral / Brigadegeneral

Gallery

References 

Naval ranks
Admirals
One-star officers